Società Sportiva Dilettantistica Calcio Marano was an Italian football club based in Marano Vicentino, Veneto. It played in Italy's Serie D.

History

Foundation 
The club was founded in 1951 as U.S. Juventina. In 1962 it changed its name to the last one.

In the season 2012–13 the team was promoted for the first time, from Eccellenza Veneto/A to Serie D.

F.C.D. Altovicentino 
In the summer of 2014 it was merged with A.C.D. Trissino-Valdagno to form F.C.D. Altovicentino.

Colors and badge 
The team's colors were white and black.

Honours
Eccellenza:
Winner (1): 2012–13

References

External links
Official website 

Defunct football clubs in Italy
Association football clubs established in 1951
Football clubs in Veneto
1951 establishments in Italy
Association football clubs disestablished in 2014
2014 disestablishments in Italy